Jadval may refer to:
 Jadval-e Darta Mokhtar
 Jadval-e Ghureh (disambiguation)
 Jadval-e Now (disambiguation)
 Jadval-e Torki